This Is the End is a 2013 American apocalyptic black comedy film written, directed and produced by Seth Rogen and Evan Goldberg, in their directorial debuts. It is a feature-length film adaptation of the short film Jay and Seth Versus the Apocalypse (2007), which was also written by Rogen and Goldberg with the short's director, Jason Stone, serving as an executive producer. Starring James Franco, Jonah Hill, Rogen, Jay Baruchel, Danny McBride, Craig Robinson, Michael Cera and Emma Watson, the film centers on fictionalized versions of its cast in the wake of a global biblical apocalypse.

Produced by Mandate Pictures and Rogen and Goldberg's Point Grey Pictures, This Is the End premiered at the Fox Village Theater on June 3, 2013, and was released theatrically in the United States on June 12, by Columbia Pictures. The film was both a critical and commercial success, receiving positive reviews from critics and grossing $126 million worldwide on a budget of $32–41.9 million.

Plot

Jay Baruchel arrives in Los Angeles to visit an old friend and fellow Canadian actor, Seth Rogen, who invites him to a housewarming party hosted by James Franco. There, Jay is uncomfortable at the crowded party, so Seth accompanies him to a convenience store for cigarettes. When beams of blue light come down and suck numerous people into the sky, Seth and Jay flee back to James' house and find the party unharmed. An earthquake strikes, and the crowd rushes outside, witnessing a sinkhole opening up in James' yard. Several celebrities and party guests are killed as Seth, Jay, James, Jonah Hill and Craig Robinson run back inside the house, where Jay tells the remaining partygoers that the earthquake has destroyed most of Los Angeles. They take inventory of their supplies, set up a ration system, board up the house, and await help.

The next morning, Danny McBride, who crashed the party and fell asleep, wakes up first and wastes much of the group's food and water due to his ignorance of the crisis. He disbelieves what the others tell him of the previous night's events until an unseen creature decapitates a man outside. Tensions rise due to various conflicts, including Jay and Seth's growing estrangement and the others' skepticism of Jay's belief that the disaster might be the Apocalypse predicted in the Book of Revelation. Emma Watson makes her way back to James' house. However, she misinterprets an overheard conversation and, believing the group intends to rape her, flees with their remaining water.

Craig goes for water stored in James' cellar, but finds the doors locked. Outside, he encounters an unknown being, causing him to believe Jay's theory. Jay and Seth dig through the floor and find water, but Danny wastes most of it out of spite, and the others kick him out of the house. Before leaving, Danny reveals that Jay was in town two months prior, but stayed at a hotel instead of with Seth because of their strained friendship. Jonah annoys Jay, who then punches him in the face. That night, Jonah prays for Jay to die and is possessed by a demon. While Craig and Jay venture to a neighbor's house to scavenge for supplies, the possessed Jonah attacks Seth and James. Jay and Craig return and help subdue Jonah, tying him to a bed. During an exorcism attempt, Jay and Seth fight and knock over a candle, starting a fire that engulfs Jonah and the house and forces the others outside.

James suggests driving to his home in Malibu, but finds his car guarded by a demon. Craig volunteers to sacrifice himself and is raptured into Heaven when the plan succeeds; the others realize they can save themselves by performing a selfless act. On the way to Malibu, the three encounter cannibals led by Danny and his sex slave, Channing Tatum. When James volunteers to sacrifice himself, a blue beam begins to pull him to Heaven, but when he taunts and insults Danny, the beam vanishes, and Danny and the other cannibals eat James alive while Seth and Jay escape and encounter Satan. Jay apologizes to Seth for his wrongdoings, while Satan attempts to eat them. A beam strikes Jay, and he begins to ascend while Seth does not. Jay grabs Seth's hand, but his presence prevents them from ascending into Heaven; Seth forces Jay to leave him behind, after which another beam appears around Seth, inadvertently skewering Satan and castrating him.

The pair arrive in Heaven and are reunited with Craig, who tells them that any wish comes true. After Jay wishes for the Backstreet Boys, the band performs "Everybody (Backstreet's Back)" as everyone in Heaven dances.

Cast
Most of the film's cast portray fictional and exaggerated versions of themselves: 
Additionally, Brian Huskey portrays a survivor who attempts to enter Franco's home and Ricky Mabe appears as one of McBride's cannibals, dressed as Santa Claus. Jason Trost makes an uncredited appearance as JTRO, a character he previously portrayed in The FP (2011). Carol Sutton also appears as a gas station cashier in an early scene. Jason Stone voiced Satan, possessed Jonah Hill and other demons in uncredited role.

Production
Regarding why they made the film, Rogen and Goldberg told interviewers that, "We always wanted to do a movie where people played themselves and something extraordinary happened; the initial version of the film was Seth Rogen and Busta Rhymes were filming a music video and a film respectively, on the Sony lot, and Antmen attacked from the center of the earth." The film is also based on Jay and Seth versus the Apocalypse, a short film created by Rogen, Goldberg and Jason Stone in 2007.

In an interview with The Guardian, Goldberg commented on influences contributing to the film, "If you drilled down to the core of what I do, it's just ripping off little bits of Charlie Kaufman. Seth and I always loved The Larry Sanders Show  too. And the popularity of reality television now also feeds into that idea of whether what we're watching is actually real. We thought working with our friends in that situation would be awesome because they're all comedians willing to take stabs at themselves." The actors play exaggerated versions of themselves, with only James Franco having no objections to doing what the script wanted him to do.

While the film is set in Los Angeles, principal photography took place in New Orleans due to financial incentives from that city. Filming rolled from February to early July 2012. The film had a production budget of $42 million, with $32 million spent in Louisiana. Modus FX made over 240 visual effects for the film, such as natural disasters, set extensions for the house, computer-generated demons and the Rapture beams. After filming wrapped, Rogen and Goldberg were displeased with their ending; they considered putting Morgan Freeman in Heaven, but he declined. Since "Everybody (Backstreet's Back)" already played in an earlier scene and Rogen and Goldberg wanted to close on an over-the-top note, they decided to feature the Backstreet Boys in the scene instead.

During filming, Emma Watson left the set due to scenes being improvised that she felt uncomfortable with, such as the progression of the graphic nature of the scenes involving Danny McBride as a cannibal and his sex slave, Channing Tatum. Rogen confirmed this, stating it was "an overall shitty situation, and it must've been hard for her to say something", elaborating "I'm very sorry and disappointed it happened, and I wish I had done more to prevent it."

During production, the film's working title was The Apocalypse, which was later changed to The End of the World. The name was then changed to This Is the End on December 20, 2012, upon the release of its first trailer and poster. This was done at the request of Rogen's Paul co-star Simon Pegg, who wrote to Rogen in concern that The End of the World was similar to his comedy film The World's End, which was also released in summer 2013 and centered around an apocalypse with an ensemble cast. As The World's End was the name of a key location in that film, Pegg felt worried that he could not change the name of his film.

Music

Soundtrack

This Is the End: Original Motion Picture Soundtrack is the soundtrack of the film. It was released on June 11, 2013 by RCA Records.

Songs featured in the film, but not in the soundtrack
 "Gangnam Style" by Psy
 "Hole in the Earth" by Deftones
 "Disco 2000" by Pulp
 "Spiteful Intervention" by Of Montreal
 "Paper Planes" by M.I.A.
 "End of the Beginning" and "War Pigs" by Black Sabbath
 "The Next Episode" by Dr. Dre

Score
The score by Henry Jackman, with additional material by Dominic Lewis and Matthew Margeson and conducted by Nick Glennie-Smith, was not officially released on its own, not even as bonus tracks on the CD or digital releases on RCA's album. Despite that, a promotional album for the score does exist, according to Soundtrack.net.

Release
On April 1, 2013, Sony released an April Fools' Day trailer for Pineapple Express 2, which was actually a teaser trailer for This Is the End. According to Rogen and Goldberg, however, the homemade Pineapple Express 2 film in This Is the End depicts what they envision for the actual sequel.

The film was rated R for "crude and sexual content throughout, brief graphic nudity, pervasive language, drug use and some violence" by the Motion Picture Association of America; this rating shocked both Rogen and Goldberg, who expected an NC-17 rating for the film. Goldberg stated: "All the ratings stuff doesn't make sense in the first place, but this is like ludicrous," Rogen then commented: "We actually made it even a little worse than we wanted and that [original] version got approved. Insanely, [we] didn't have a ratings issue."

Sony re-released the film in 2,000 theaters across North America on September 6, 2013.

Home media
The film was released on DVD and Blu-ray on October 1, 2013. It was the last film to be rented by Blockbuster Video before they went out of business at 11:00 PM on November 9, 2013. The Blu-ray release fully contains the original short the film was based on, Jay and Seth Versus the Apocalypse, as a special feature.

Reception

Box office
This Is the End grossed $101.5 million in North America and $25.1 million in other territories for a worldwide total of $126.5 million, against a production budget of $32 million. It made a net profit of $50 million, when factoring together all expenses and revenues for the film.

The film was released in North America on June 12, 2013, alongside Man of Steel, and was projected to open to around $12 million from 3,055 theaters. The film made $7.8 million on its first day and went on to debut to $20.7 million in its opening weekend (a five-day total of $33 million), finishing second at the box office behind Man of Steel ($116.6 million). In its second weekend it grossed $13.3 million, dropping to 4th.

Critical response

The site's critical consensus reads, "Energetic, self-deprecating performances and enough guffaw-inducing humor make up for the flaws in This Is the End'''s loosely written script." On Metacritic, the film has a weighted average score of 67 out of 100, based on 41 critics, indicating "generally favorable reviews". Audiences polled by CinemaScore gave the film an average grade of "B+" on an A+ to F scale.

Owen Gleiberman of Entertainment Weekly gave the film a letter grade of "A", saying, "You could sit through a year's worth of Hollywood comedies and still not see anything that's genuinely knock-your-socks-off audacious. But This Is the End . . truly is. It's the wildest screen comedy in a long time and also the smartest, the most fearlessly inspired and the snort-out-loud funniest." Brian D. Johnson of Maclean's wrote, "There could be worse ways to experience the apocalypse than with a party of stoned celebrities at James Franco's house. For one thing, his epic art collection can be used to board up the cracking walls against demons and zombies. That's the screwball scenario of This Is the End...The film unfolds as a profanely funny showbiz parody. But with perfect timing, it also sends up a genre that has recently gone viral at the multiplex: the apoca-blockbuster."

Not all reviews were positive; Rick Groen of Canada's The Globe and Mail gave the film one-and-a-half stars out of five, comparing the film to the interminable wait for a cancelled bus and referring to the actors in the film as "the lazy, the privileged and the mirthless".

Possible sequel
When Evan Goldberg was asked whether a sequel to the film was probable, he said, "If you ask me, I'd say there's a pretty good chance of a sequel. If you ask Seth Rogen, he'd say no." In June 2013, Goldberg announced some ideas for a sequel in which the apocalypse occurs at the premiere of the first film. "Seth's a cokehead in this version, Michael Cera is a calm dude with a boyfriend, Rihanna and The Backstreet Boys are back," Goldberg said in an interview. "We have a lot of ideas: a heaven and hell for example and a Garden of Eden version where Danny [McBride] is Adam." Despite this, Goldberg has also stated that it would be difficult to recreate the casting conditions from the first film due to different schedules, believing them to be a stroke of luck by saying: "I honestly don't know if we could get the guys together [again]." In May 2014, Rogen posted an update about a potential sequel, saying: "I don't think we'll make a sequel to This Is the End, but if we did, it would be called No, THIS Is the End."

AdaptationThis Is the End was adapted into a 3D maze titled This Is the End 3D for Halloween Horror Nights at Universal Studios Hollywood in 2015. The maze served as the event's first horror/comedy-based attraction.

See also

 List of films that most frequently use the word "fuck"
 It's a Disaster – a 2012 black comedy film about couples at a brunch realizing that the world is ending
 The World's End – 2013 science fiction comedy film 
 Rapture-Palooza'' – another 2013 apocalypse-themed comedy that also starred Craig Robinson

References

External links

 
 
 
 
 

2013 films
2010s English-language films
2013 black comedy films
2013 comedy horror films
2013 directorial debut films
2010s satirical films
2010s disaster films
2010s monster movies
2010s buddy comedy films
2010s fantasy comedy films
2010s sex comedy films
2010s screwball comedy films
American disaster films
American monster movies
American screwball comedy films
American buddy comedy films
American black comedy films
American comedy horror films
American fantasy comedy films
American sex comedy films
American satirical films
American films about cannabis
Apocalyptic films
American dystopian films
Demons in film
Adultery in films
Giant monster films
The Devil in film
Features based on short films
Films scored by Henry Jackman
Films about actors
Films about death
Films about drugs
Films about cannibalism
Films about the afterlife
Films about parties
Films about religion
Cultural depictions of actors
Films directed by Seth Rogen
Films produced by Seth Rogen
Films with screenplays by Seth Rogen
Films directed by Evan Goldberg
Films produced by Evan Goldberg
Films with screenplays by Evan Goldberg
Films set in heaven
Films set in Los Angeles
Films set in 2012
Films shot in New Orleans
Columbia Pictures films
Mandate Pictures films
Point Grey Pictures films
Religious comedy films
Religious horror films
Religious satire films
Parodies of horror
2010s American films
Films about the rapture